Princess/Princesa is an EP and third CD by MC Magic.

Track listing
From allmusic.com:

 Princess - 3:05
 Princesa - 3:05
 Magic City Part 2 (Snippet) - 3:30
 Sin Ti (Remix) (featuring Sophia Maria) - 3:30
 Cruzin' (Remix) (featuring Butch Cassidy, Damizza and Down) - 4:07
 Need You in My Life (featuring Mal Hablado) - 3:54
 Sexy Lady (Remix) (featuring DJ Kane) - 4:20
 Somebody Like You (featuring Lil Tweety) - 4:02
 Princess (Instrumental) - 3:04
 Princess (Acappella) - 3:05

References

MC Magic albums
2008 EPs